FC Oberlausitz Neugersdorf is a German association football club from the town of Ebersbach-Neugersdorf in the Upper Lusatia (German:Oberlausitz) region of Saxony.

The club's greatest success came in 2014–15 when it won promotion to the Regionalliga Nordost, one of the five regional leagues making up the fourth tier of German club football. This was courtesy of a runners-up finish in the NOFV-Oberliga Süd.

History
The club was formed on 12 December 1992 when the football department of TBSV Neugersdorf became independent. For the first years of its existence, the club played as OFC Neugersdorf, but on 1 July 2003 it adopted its current name.

After a Bezirksliga championship in 1995, the club entered the at the time fifth-tier Landesliga Sachsen, now known as the Sachsenliga. Neugersdorf gradually improved at this level after coming in on the eleventh position in its first season. In 1998–99 the club finished runners-up in the league, came third the season after and finally won the league in 2000–01.

The club spent its next five seasons in the fourth tier NOFV-Oberliga Süd with a ninth place in 2003–04 as its best result. In 2005–06, however, the team came in last in the league and was relegated to the Landesliga. After seven seasons in this league, Neugersdorf won the Sachsenliga for a second time in 2012–13 and returned to the Oberliga. The club's results were now much improved, finishing third in its first season back. In 2014–15 it finished runners-up to RB Leipzig II and, courtesy to the Regionalliga Nordost being expanded from 16 to 18 teams, was promoted to the latter for the first time.

After finishing 15th in the 2018–19 season, the club's board decided to voluntarily step away from the league and accept relegation to the Oberliga, a decision that was mostly motivated by financial reasons.

Honours
The club's honours:
 NOFV-Oberliga Süd
 Runners-up: 2015
 Sachsenliga
 Champions: 2001, 2013
 Runners-up: 1999, 2009
 Saxony Cup
 Runners-up: 2014

Current squad

References

External links
 Official club website 
 FC Oberlausitz Neugersdorf at weltfussball.de 

Football clubs in Germany
Football clubs in Saxony
Association football clubs established in 1992
1992 establishments in Germany
Ebersbach-Neugersdorf